Noel Gourdin (born March 14, 1981), is a singer and an R&B artist from Boston, Massachusetts. He is most known for his song called "The River", which appeared on the Billboard charts.

Discography

Albums

Singles

ACurrent single.

References

External links
 Official website

1981 births
Living people
21st-century African-American male singers